The Independent Patriot is a 1737 comedy play by Francis Lynch. 

The play mocks the European tourism of the British elite while on the Grand Tour. The work is dedicated to Lord Burlington, known for his support for Palladian architecture, by suggesting he had more usefully used his time abroad.

It was produced at the Lincoln's Inn Fields Theatre by Henry Giffard's company which had recently moved there from Goodman's Fields Theatre.

Original cast
 Alderman Export - Mr Lion
 Sanguine - Thomas Wright
 Medium - Benjamin Johnson
 Gripacre - William Giffard
 Addle - Henry Giffard
 Bamwell - Mr Barden
 Roseband - William Havard
 Spruce - Henry Woodward
 Lady Warble - Mrs Roberts
 Julia - Anna Marcella Giffard
 Dulcissa - Sarah Hamilton
 Jacqueline - Charlotte Charke
 Charlotte - Mrs Hughes

References

Bibliography
 Black, Jeremy. Culture in Eighteenth-Century England: A Subject for Taste. A&C Black, 2007.
 Burling, William J. A Checklist of New Plays and Entertainments on the London Stage, 1700-1737. Fairleigh Dickinson Univ Press, 1992.
 Nicoll, Allardyce. A History of Early Eighteenth Century Drama: 1700-1750. CUP Archive, 1927.

1737 plays
British plays
West End plays
Comedy plays